Switzerland competed at the 2012 Winter Youth Olympics in Innsbruck, Austria.

Medalists

Alpine skiing

Switzerland qualified 4 athletes.

Boys

Girls

Team

Biathlon

Switzerland qualified 3 athletes.

Boys

Girls

Mixed

Cross-country skiing

Switzerland qualified 2 athletes.

Boys

Girls

Sprint

Mixed

Curling

Switzerland qualified 1 team.

Roster
Skip: Michael Brunner
Third: Elena Stern
Second: Romano Meier
Lead: Lisa Gisler

Mixed Team

Round-robin results

Draw 1

Draw 2

Draw 3

Draw 4

Draw 5

Draw 6

Draw 7

Quarterfinals

Semifinals

Gold Medal Game

Mixed doubles

Round of 32

Round of 16

Quarterfinals

Semifinals

Gold Medal Game

Figure skating

Switzerland qualified 2 athletes.

Boys

Girls

Mixed

Freestyle skiing

Switzerland qualified 4 athletes.

Ski Cross

Ski Half-Pipe

Luge

Switzerland qualified 1 athlete.

Boys

Nordic combined

Switzerland qualified 1 athlete.

Boys

Skeleton

Switzerland qualified 1 athlete.

Boys

Ski jumping

Switzerland qualified 1 athlete.

Boys

Snowboarding

Switzerland qualified 2 athletes.

Boys

Girls

See also
Switzerland at the 2012 Summer Olympics

References

2012 in Swiss sport
Nations at the 2012 Winter Youth Olympics
Switzerland at the Youth Olympics